was a Japanese statesman, courtier and politician during the Heian period. He also was known as Hōkō-in Daijin and Higashi-sanjō-dono.

Career
Kaneie served as a minister during the reigns of Emperor En'yū, Emperor Kazan and Emperor Ichijō.

After his rival brother Kanemichi's death in 977 he was appointed to Udaijin by his cousin Yoritada who became Kampaku after Kanemichi's death. He and his son Michikane encouraged Emperor Kazan to abdicate to accelerate Kaneie's accession to regent. Kaneie told Kazan that the Imperial Regalia was already held by Ichijo, and hence Kazan should not continue as ruler. Kazan acquiesced to Kaneie's demands, under some pressure, and went to the Gangō-ji monastery in Nara. Kaneie's second son, Michikane, went with Kazan; he intended to also take the tonsure. When they arrived at the monastery, Michikane claimed that he would like to see his parents as a layman for the last time - he did not return. When Emperor Ichijo succeeded, Kaneie became Sesshō of Emperor Ichijō.

 969 (Anna 1): Ju Sammi (従三位)
 970 (Anna 2): Chūnagon
 972 (Tenroku 3, 11th month): Kaneie was promoted from the office of Chūnagon to Dainagon
 978 (Jōgen 3, 10th month): Kaneie was named Udaijin.
 986 (Kanna 2, 24th day of the 6th month): Sesshō (摂政) for Emperor Ichijō
 986 (Kanna 2, 20th day of the 7th month): retire from Udaijin
 989 (Eiso 1, 12th month): Kaneie is named daijō daijin.
 990 (Shōryaku 1, 5th month): Kaneie fell seriously ill; and he abandoned his offices to become a Buddhist monk.
 July 26, 990 (Shōryaku 1, 2nd day of the 7th month): Kaneie died at the age of 62.

Family
Kaneie had four brothers:  Kanemichi,  Kinsue, Koretada, and Tamemitsu.

 Father: Fujiwara no Morosuke (藤原師輔, 909–960)
 Mother: Fujiwara no Moriko (藤原盛子, ?–943), daughter of Fujiwara no Tsunekuni (藤原経邦).
 Wife: Fujiwara no Tokihime (藤原時姫, ?–980), daughter of Fujiwara no Nakamasa (藤原中正).
 1st son: Fujiwara no Michitaka (藤原道隆, 953–995), Sesshō and Kampaku of Emperor Ichijō.
 3rd son: Fujiwara no Michikane (藤原道兼, 961–995), Kampaku of Emperor Ichijō.
 5th son: Fujiwara no Michinaga (藤原道長, 966–1028), Kampaku of Emperor Go-Ichijō.
 1st daughter: Fujiwara no Chōshi (藤原超子, 954?-982), consort of Emperor Reizei and mother of Emperor Sanjō.
 2nd daughter: Fujiwara no Senshi (藤原詮子, 962–1002), consort of Emperor En'yū and mother of Emperor Ichijō.
 Wife: known as Udaisyō Michitsuna no Haha (Mother of Udaishō Michitsuna) (右大将道綱母, 936?-995). She wrote Kagerō Nikki (蜻蛉日記) and was the daughter of Fujiwara no Tomoyasu (藤原倫寧の娘).
 2nd son: Fujiwara no Michitsuna (藤原道綱, 955–1020), Dainagon.
 Wife: Yasukonaishinnō (保子内親王, 949–987), third daughter of Emperor Murakami.
 Wife: Tai no Ankata (対の御方), daughter of Fujiwara no Kuninori (藤原国章).
 3rd daughter: Fujiwara no Yasuko/Suishi (藤原綏子, 974–1004), consort of Emperor Sanjō.
 Wife: name unknown, Chūjō miyasudokoro (中将御息所), possibly daughter of Fujiwara no Kanetada (藤原懐忠).
 Wife: name unknown.
 Wife: daughter of Fujiwara no Tadamoto (藤原忠幹の娘)
 4th son: Fujiwara no Michiyoshi (藤原道義)
 Wife: daughter of Minamoto no Kanetada (源兼忠の娘)
 Daughter: name unknown (960?-), lady in waiting for her sister Michitsuna no Haha.

Notes

References
 Brinkley, Frank and Dairoku Kikuchi. (1915). A History of the Japanese People from the Earliest Times to the End of the Meiji Era. New York: Encyclopædia Britannica. OCLC 413099
 Nussbaum, Louis-Frédéric and Käthe Roth. (2005).  Japan encyclopedia. Cambridge: Harvard University Press. ;  OCLC 58053128
 Titsingh, Isaac. (1834). Nihon Odai Ichiran; ou,  Annales des empereurs du Japon.  Paris: Royal Asiatic Society, Oriental Translation Fund of Great Britain and Ireland. OCLC 5850691

929 births
990 deaths
Fujiwara clan
Regents of Japan